El Hassan Lahssini (born 1 January 1975) is a retired French long-distance runner.

International competition record

Personal bests
1500 metres – 3:38.88 (1997)
3000 metres – 7:30.53 (1996)
Two miles – 8:17.39 (1999)
5000 metres – 13:04.32 (1996)
10,000 metres – 27:50.53 (2002)
10K run – 28:22 (2008)
Half marathon – 1:02:28 (2003)
30 kilometres – 1:30:10 (2004)
Marathon – 2:10:10 (2004)

References

External links

1975 births
Living people
French male long-distance runners
French male marathon runners
Olympic athletes of France
Athletes (track and field) at the 2004 Summer Olympics
World Athletics Championships athletes for France
Mediterranean Games silver medalists for Morocco
Moroccan male long-distance runners
Mediterranean Games medalists in athletics
Athletes (track and field) at the 1997 Mediterranean Games